Juelsminde is a town in Hedensted Municipality, Denmark.

Notable people 
 Gunnar Berg (1909–1989) a Swiss-born Danish composer and leading exponent of serialism. Between 1965 and 1976 he lived at the old school at Lindved between Horsens and Juelsminde
 Anders Schmidt Hansen (born 1978 in Juelsminde) a Danish professional golfer.

References

Ports and harbours of Denmark
Cities and towns in the Central Denmark Region
Hedensted Municipality